AKUT Search and Rescue Association is a Turkish non-governmental organization for disaster search and rescue relief. It was established in 1995 as a grassroots organization by seven leading outdoor athletes of Turkey and officially founded as an association in 1996.

The organization delivers emergency and disaster relief to people trapped in caves, lost on mountains or to victims of earthquake or flood disasters at home and abroad. The initial purpose of the association's establishment was to provide search and rescue relief for climbers in emergency as no local organization of this type existed so far.

History
The group was formed first in the aftermath of a mountaineering accident occurred in 1994 on Bolkar Mountains, at which two local climbers were involved. In December 1995, a group of volunteer mountaineers conducted their first organized mission on Mt. Uludağ, and rescued people, who got lost in the fog, freezing in heavy snowfall. It was during this operation that the group named itself "AKUT", which is a concept in medicine terminology.

The organization was officially incorporated in the beginning of 1996. The members received earthquake and flood training within the next year. This qualified the organization to work cooperative alongside official agencies during their efforts of natural disaster relief. On January 15, 1999, AKUT was given the status of a charitable organization by the Turkish government.

AKUT became generally known after it quickly reacted to the 1999 İzmit earthquake, and worked with its 150 permanent members and coordinated over 1,000 helpers, who rescued about 200 people from the debris.

In 1999, the organization became a member of United Nations' Search and Rescue Advisory Group (INSARAG). AKUT was officially recognized in 2011 as a "mid-sized search and rescue team" by INSARAG.

AKUT undertook international missions following the 1999 Athens earthquake in Greece, the 1999 Taiwan earthquake, the 2001 Gujarat earthquake in India and the 2003 Bam earthquake in Iran.

AKUT responded immediately to the massive earthquakes of Feb 6, 2023, sending 30 teams to Kahramanmaraş, Adiyaman, Gaziantep, Malatya, Hatay, Osmaniye and Adana.

Organization

As of 2015, the organization counts about 250 core members and is also able to deploy around one thousand volunteers if needed. It has appropriate technical equipment for its operations. The headquarters in Istanbul coordinates 35 teams formed in various cities across the country and organize also specific training courses related to search and rescue, disaster preparedness and response for the members and the volunteers. The number of people rescued by AKUT totaled 2062 as of June 2015.

References

External links
 Official webpage
 Official webpage of Ankara Team  rev. 6. Nov. 2011
 INSARAG USAR Directory rev. 6. Nov. 2011
 IRO - Mitgliedsorganisationen rev. 6. Nov. 2011 (in German)

Other References
Kuwaiti general's daughter rescued in Uludağ, Today’s Zaman, September 2, 2012
Disaster training center to be established in Erzurum, Hürriyet Daily News, August 27, 2012
AKUT (Search and Rescue Association) Rescues the Polish Couple, Sun Express News, July 16, 2012
Two missing Britons found in Turkish Riviera, Hürriyet Daily News, July 13, 2012
“Earthquake-Simulator Truck” will be in Fethiye on April 23., Sun Express News, April 16, 2012
AKUT provides fast response in 'Slow City' of Seferihisar, Hürriyet Daily News, April 4, 2011
Voluntary Service In Twenty-Six Locations, AnadoluJet Magazine, April 2011
Turkey sends aid team to quake-hit Japan, Hürriyet Daily News, March 12, 2011
You’ve Got To Do What You Love, Or Love What You Do, AnadoluJet Magazine, December 2010
Missing Irish father and son found thanks to camera flash, Today’s Zaman, August 4, 2010
Turkish NGO creates fake quakes to advocate readiness, Hürriyet Daily News, May 26, 2010
Turkish team rescues another Haiti quake survivor, Hürriyet Daily News, January 22, 2010
More Turkish rescue teams arrive in Haiti, Hürriyet Daily News, January 19, 2010
Number of Turkish aid teams in Haiti increases to four,  Today’s Zaman, January 20, 2010
A helping hand that reached under the ruble, Hürriyet Daily News, August 19, 2009
Fears for missing former British Aerospace manager in Turkey, The Telegraph,August 14, 2009
Chinese documentary makers climb Mount Ararat, Hürriyet Daily News, March 9, 2007
Rescue teams back, Turkish business community takes charge to help Pakistan, Hürriyet Daily News, October 17, 2005
Pakistan Earthquake, Civil Defense and AKUT,Commentary by Nasuh Mahruki, Today’s Zaman, October 17, 2005
Rescuers Reach Pakistani City Destroyed by Huge Earthquake, The New York Times,October 10, 2005
Latest death toll from collapsed building reaches 92, Hürriyet Daily News, February 11, 2004
Rescue dispute grows, Hürriyet Daily News, September 2, 2004
Rescue Teams Improve Their Equipments After August 17, Today’s Zaman, August 17, 2004
Turkish search and rescue team returns from Iran, Hürriyet Daily News, December 31, 2003
Bingol Rescue Teams Sent Home with Applause and Thanks, Today’s Zaman, May 5, 2003
AKUT's rescue effort in Greece stirs hearts, Hürriyet Daily News, September 10, 1999
Turkey rescuers recall 921 earthquake mission in Taiwan, Focus Taiwan News Channel,September 23, 2012
AKUT Returns to Pakistan , Social Accountability International (SAI), November 2012
AKUT President Nasuh Mahruki, Gives a Seminar to AGU’s Staff about Teamwork Abdullah Gul University News
Earthquake Training for Children (Earthquake Awareness) and AKUT Project,  Sabancı University Civic Involvement Projects
INSARAG - USAR Directory,AKUT Team, United Nations Office for the Coordination of Humanitarian Affairs
Expedition: Ararat 2001 Peace Climb, EverestNews

Charities based in Turkey
Mountain rescue agencies
Organizations established in 1996
Organizations based in Istanbul
Şişli
Volunteer search and rescue organizations
1996 establishments in Turkey
Emergency services in Turkey